Writeable control store may refer to 
 Writable control store (WCS), memory used to load the operating system of the Amiga 1000
 Writable control store, memory used to store microprograms on machines where the microcode is reloadable